Sweets is a hamlet between Middle Crackington and Higher Crackington in north Cornwall, England, United Kingdom.

References

Hamlets in Cornwall